Here Am I may refer to:
 "Here Am I" (Bonnie Tyler song), 1978
 Here Am I (Bonnie Tyler album)
 Here Am I (Judith Durham album)
 "Here Am I" (Dragon song), 1989